Graeme Rowley Aerodrome  is located about 10 km northwest of Fortescue Metals Group's Christmas Creek mine in Western Australia.

Airlines and destinations

See also
 Fortescue Dave Forrest Airport
 List of airports in Western Australia
 Aviation transport in Australia

References

External links
 Airservices Aerodromes & Procedure Charts

Fortescue Metals Group
Pilbara airports